City of Hawkinsville was a paddle steamer constructed in Georgia in 1886. Sold in 1900 to a Tampa, Florida company, it delivered cargo and lumber along the Suwannee River. Eventually rendered obsolete by the advent of railroads in the region, it was abandoned in the middle of the Suwannee in 1922.

It became the third Florida Underwater Archaeological Preserve when it opened to the public in 1992. On May 31, 2001 it was added to the U.S. National Register of Historic Places as City of Hawkinsville (shipwreck). It is located in Dixie County, 100 yards south of the Old Town railroad trestle (which is part of the Nature Coast State Trail).

History

Georgia
In 1886, the Hawkinsville (Georgia) Deepwater Boat Lines had the wooden-hulled City of Hawkinsville built for them in Abbeville, Georgia.

After 14 years of service, they sold it to the Gulf Transportation Company of Tampa.

Florida
Supplies included construction materials for the railroads that would end the need for the steamboat.

In 1922, the steamboat was abandoned in the Suwanee near what is now the railroad trestle built across the river, reducing the need for a boat to cross the river at that point. It remains at this location, preserved as one of the Florida Underwater Archaeological Preserves.

Today
The wreck of the steamboat has become part of the river's ecosystem, and was added to the Florida Underwater Archaeological Preserve system in 1992. Most of it is remarkably intact, and rests on a ledge in the middle of the Suwannee, visible from the river's surface. Diving is allowed, but only for those with advanced open water certification; venturing within the wreck itself is not permitted.

References

External links
 Dixie County listings at National Register of Historic Places
 City of Hawkinsville at Florida's Shipwrecks - 300 Years of Maritime History
 Museums in the Sea City of Hawkinsville

Archaeological sites in Florida
Protected areas of Dixie County, Florida
Shipwrecks in rivers
Shipwrecks on the National Register of Historic Places in Florida
Florida Underwater Archaeological Preserves
National Register of Historic Places in Dixie County, Florida